The Alhambra Unified School District is a school district based in Alhambra, California.

AUSD serves the City of Alhambra, most of the City of Monterey Park, and parts of the Cities of San Gabriel and Rosemead. District headquarters is located at 1515 W. Mission Road, Alhambra, California 91803.

History
The Alhambra School District, which operated K-8 schools, and Alhambra Union High School District unified in 2004 to create the Alhambra Unified School District.

Board of Education
Alhambra Unified School District Board of Education members are represented by a geographical district composed of five members. The elections are held on the first Tuesday after the first Monday in November of even-numbered years at the same time the Alhambra City Council holds its elections.

School Uniform
Students in grades Kindergarten through 8 are required to wear school uniforms .

The policy, which applied to the Alhambra School District, began in September 1996. The policy remained after the consolidation of ASD and AHSD, with the policy applying to all Kindergarten through 8th-grade students.

About every one to three years, the school board gives out surveys for the parents to fill out, asking for the opinion of whether or not the students should wear uniform. The school district asks for the students to wear uniform, but has made the exception of letting students include any color jacket or socks. Uniform colors include navy blue and white.

Students from some Elementary Schools may also apply for clothing permits to be dismissed from wearing school uniforms. The only exception for clothing while on a permit are garments that are explicit or have inappropriate content.

Schools

Elementary Schools (K through 8)

 Ramona School (Alhambra)
Martha Baldwin School (Alhambra)
Brightwood School (Monterey Park)
Emery Park School (Alhambra)
Fremont School (Alhambra)
Garfield School (Alhambra)
Granada School (Alhambra)
Marguerita School (Alhambra)
Monterey Highlands Elementary School (Monterey Park)
Park School (Alhambra)
Repetto School (Monterey Park)
Ynez School (Monterey Park)
William Northrup School (Alhambra)

High schools

Zoned high schools

Alhambra High School (Alhambra), serving the western portion of Alhambra.
Mark Keppel High School (Alhambra), serving the southern portion of Alhambra and most of Monterey Park.
San Gabriel High School (Alhambra), serving the eastern portion of Alhambra, the southern portion of Rosemead and a small portion of San Gabriel.
Century High School (Alhambra)
Independence High School (Alhambra)

Feeder elementary schools
Garvey School District, a K-8 district, "feeds" into AUSD.

References

External links

Alhambra Unified School District website
Links to individual AUSD school websites

San Gabriel Valley
School districts in Los Angeles County, California
2004 establishments in California
Alhambra, California